G. M. Sundar is an Indian actor and film producer who has acted in a number of Tamil  films. He turned producer for the film Urumattram.

Career 
He studied acting at the Film and Television institute, Adyar. He was given his first role by director K. Balachander in the film Punnagai Mannan.

Later, Sundar was cast by Kamal Haasan in the film Kadamai Kanniyam Kattupaadu and Sathyaa, produced by Raaj Kamal Films.

Apart from mainstream films, Sundar played the lead role in the national award-winning film Ooruku Nooruper directed by B. Lenin. He also acted in and produced a short film, Urumattram, which won the national award for the Best Environmental Film.

After a brief hiatus, Sundar has entered into the second phase of his acting career through Nalan Kumarasamy's Kadhalum Kadanthu Pogum, starring Vijay Sethupathi and Madonna Sebastian. It was a critical and box office success.

Filmography

References 

Living people
Male actors in Tamil cinema
Tamil film producers
Tamil male actors
Year of birth missing (living people)